KOFK may refer to:

 the ICAO code for Karl Stefan Memorial Airport, in Norfolk, Nebraska, United States
 KOFK-FM, a radio station (88.1 FM) licensed to serve Bozeman, Montana, United States\